Stamper Peak is a peak (2,180 m) 10 nautical miles (18 km) east-northeast of Mount Gilruth in the Admiralty Mountains. It rises from the south-central part of the ridge separating Dugdale and Ommanney Glaciers. Mapped by the United States Geological Survey (USGS) from surveys and U.S. Navy air photos, 1960–63. Named by Advisory Committee on Antarctic Names (US-ACAN) for Wilburn E. Stamper, RM2, U.S. Navy, radioman at McMurdo Station, 1967.

Mountains of Victoria Land
Pennell Coast